Ippoliti is an Italian surname. Its root may be related to  Hippolyte, the  Amazonian queen in Greek mythology. Notable people with the surname include:

Amy Ippoliti (born 1969), American yoga teacher
Fausto Ippoliti (born 1979), Italian racing driver
Ippolito Ippoliti, Italian footballer
Jerry Ippoliti (born c. 1935), American football player and coach
Luca Ippoliti (born 1979), Italian futsal player
Nicola Ippoliti (died 1511), Roman Catholic prelate who served as Archbishop of Ariano
Silvano Ippoliti (1922–1994), Italian cinematographer

Italian-language surnames